Pepe Rubio (September 10, 1931 – March 15, 2012) was a Spanish actor, known for comedies, whose professional career began in 1953 with theater. 

Rubio was born in Lubrín, Province of Almería, Andalusia in 1931. His father was a miner. Rubio moved to Barcelona with his family, where he worked as in a textile factory. He joined the military when he was eighteen years old.

Rubio's film debut was in the 1959 Spanish movie, House of Troy. Other credits included the 1963 dramatic film, Dulcinea; Behind the Mask of Zorro in 1965

Pepe Rubio died on March 15, 2012, in Madrid at the age of 80.

Selected filmography
College Boarding House (1959)
 Litri and His Shadow (1960)
 Green Harvest (1961)
 You and Me Are Three (1962)

References

1931 births
2012 deaths
Spanish male film actors
Spanish male stage actors
People from the Province of Almería